Steinar Karlsen is a Norwegian guitarist who plays mostly surf music. He has released four albums since 2010; his 2015 album Tur was called "one of the best instrumental releases of the year" by Vintage Guitar.

Karlsen is from Eikefjord. Beside his solo career he also plays with the bands Good Time Charlie (since 2003) and Hot Little Mama. He was previously in Front Page, The Tracemen, and in 1980 in The Young Lords. Among his influences he cites oud player John Berberian and Mickey Baker's 1959 album Wildest Guitar.

Discography
Ulydium (2011)
Hanens Død (2013)
Tog til Sunnfjord (2015)
Tur (2015)

References

External links

Living people
People from Flora, Norway
21st-century Norwegian guitarists
Year of birth missing (living people)